William Peirce Ennis Jr. (April 27, 1904 – December 9, 1989) was a career officer in the United States Army who served as commandant of the Army War College and rose to the rank of lieutenant general.

Early life
Ennis was born on April 27, 1904 at Fort Hamilton, New York, where his father, Lieutenant (later brigadier general) William Peirce Ennis Sr. (1878–1968), was stationed.  His mother was Eda (Totten) Ennis.  He was a direct descendant of Lieutenant William Ennis who served in the Continental Army during the American Revolution and was an original member of the Rhode Island Society of the Cincinnati.

He entered the United States Military Academy at West Point, New York in 1922 and graduated in 1926.  He had strong family ties to West Point as both his father and grandfather, Brigadier General William Ennis, were graduates of West Point.  Like his father and grandfather, Ennis was commissioned as an Artillery officer and rose to become a general.  On his mother's side of the family, he was the grandson of 1st Lieutenant C.A.L. Totten and the great grandson of Brigadier General James Totten, both of whom were also graduates of West Point.

Military career
Ennis married Frances Cassel Dwyer (1903–1994) on April 27, 1927, shortly after his graduation from West Point. He was stationed in the Philippines in the late 1920s.  Ennis completed the Battery Officer's Basic Course at the Field Artillery School in 1931 and then served as a tactical officer at West Point from 1931 to 1936.

During World War II, Ennis graduated from the General Staff Course in 1942.  He was promoted to colonel in November 1942 and then served in North Africa and Italy.  In Italy he served as the assistant commander of the IV Corps Artillery in support of Free French forces.  He was awarded the Legion of Merit and the Bronze Star Medal with two oak leaf clusters for his service during World War II.  After the war, he attended the National War College, graduating in 1949.

During the Korean War, he commanded the X Corps Artillery during combat operations.  For this service, he was awarded the Distinguished Service Medal, the Silver Star and two Air Medals.

He later commanded the division artillery of the 82nd Airborne Division and served with the American delegation to NATO headquarters. He was also commandant of the Army War College at Carlisle, Pennsylvania.

Ennis was promoted to lieutenant general on July 30, 1960 and was assigned as commanding officer of the Weapon Systems Evaluation Group in Washington, D. C.   He retired from the Army on August 31, 1962 after 36 years of active service. He was awarded a second Distinguished Service Medal upon his retirement.

Retirement and death
After his retirement, Ennis lived in Newport, Rhode Island.  He died at Massachusetts General Hospital on December 9, 1989 at the age of 85. He was buried in Arlington National Cemetery.

Awards
Distinguished Service Medal with oak leaf cluster
Silver Star
Legion of Merit
Bronze Star Medal with two oak leaf clusters
Air Medal with oak leaf cluster
American Defense Service Medal
European-African-Middle Eastern Campaign Medal
World War II Victory Medal
National Defense Service Medal
Korean Service Medal
Korean Presidential Unit Citation
United Nations Korea Medal

Dates of rank
Cadet, USMA – July 1, 1922
2nd Lieutenant (RA) – June 12, 1926
1st Lieutenant (RA) – December 1, 1931
Captain (RA) – June 12, 1936
Major (AUS) – January 31, 1941
Lieutenant Colonel (AUS) – February 1, 1942
Colonel (AUS) – November 10, 1942
Major (RA) – June 12, 1945
Lieutenant Colonel (RA) –
Major General (AUS) – February 23, 1950
Colonel (RA) – May 15, 1950
Brigadier General (AUS) – April 15, 1951
Major General (RA) – April 1, 1955
Lieutenant General (RA) – July 30, 1960
Retired – July 31, 1962

References

1904 births
1989 deaths
United States Military Academy alumni
United States Military Academy faculty
United States Army personnel of World War II
Recipients of the Legion of Merit
National War College alumni
United States Army personnel of the Korean War
Recipients of the Air Medal
Recipients of the Silver Star
United States Army generals
Recipients of the Distinguished Service Medal (US Army)
United States Army War College faculty
People from Newport, Rhode Island
Burials at Arlington National Cemetery